Fryday is one of the largest networking clubs for professionals organising series of social and business networking events across Eastern Europe and Central Asia. It is currently active in Armenia,  Austria, Azerbaijan, Belarus, Bulgaria,  Costa Rica, the Czech Republic, Estonia, Georgia, Hungary, Kazakhstan, Kyrgyzstan, Latvia, Lithuania, Moldova, Poland, Romania, Russia, Slovakia,  Switzerland,  Sweden, Tajikistan, Turkmenistan, Ukraine and Uzbekistan. 
Fryday community is composed of cosmopolitan professional crowd, business owners, government officials and media representatives. Using both, offline and online platforms, the Fryday network works to bring people together so that they can make new contacts  as well as sustain those already existing.

History  
The idea of Fryday comes from the Stockholm style after work mingles. The first event was on April 21, 2010 with 17 guests in Kyiv. Since 2012 Fryday events are frequented by more than 500 people.

In February 2012 the new Fryday concept is tested and introduced in Kyiv - Fryday W event, where well known and accomplished speakers share some meaningful ideas with the audience. Ambassadors, top managers and senior politicians are typical speakers at Ws. Fryday W became an excellent way for businesses to meet up with their target audience, commercial chamber reps of foreign countries, diplomats and entrepreneurs informally.

What makes Fryday's network especially appealing nowadays is its extensive online presence with members who are decision makers in successful businesses, covering nearly all business sectors.

Concepts 
There are four concepts of Fryday events: Fryday Afterwork and Fryday W. 
Afterwork is a relaxed business-socialising event gathering around 500 guests on Friday evenings in top venues of city downtowns. These events are typically happening every second Friday of each month. The entrance to regular Afterwork is free of charge.

The second concept is Fryday W, which is held on week days, and has a more professional and thematical approach to networking. Themes of W events are determined by spheres of invited speakers. There are usually fewer guests at W events, around 150, who typically relate to an industry of a speaker. The entrance to Fryday W for guests is EUR 10.

The third and fourth concepts, Fryday Good Morning and Fryday Training, were both developed during 2015 and has by November 2015 not yet proven either successes nor failures.

During spring 2013 the people behind Fryday have also launched an affiliated website Socialite.nu that aims to function as a broader umbrella for business-networking.
Fryday also serves a platform for online networking through the spectrum of social media, connecting  Fryday members from different cities. The network represents one of the biggest online communities in Eastern Europe, having a great presence on LinkedIn  and Facebook, as well as has its own YouTube channel, which is being constantly updated with videos from Fryday events.

Fryday Branches 
The biggest Fryday community is in Kyiv, where the roots of the Fryday movement are. The first event in Kyiv was on April 21, 2010. In September 2011 Fryday started to hold the events in Almaty (Kazakhstan), following by Tbilisi (Georgia) in January and Astana (Kazakhstan) in March 2012. As of August 2013 Fryday expanded across 29 cities in 21 countries of Eastern Europe and Central Asia. By late 2015 Fryday had continued its expansion westwards and had launched also in Austria, Switzerland and Sweden

References

External links 
Official website
Restorania.com The best restaurants of Kiev and Ukraine, reviews, table reservations with discounts
Business Ukraine - Kyiv networking and social media
Friends – ‘Thank God it's Fryday!’
Forbes.ua - Fryday Kyiv
SPIEGEL ONLINE - Kulturschock Ukraine: Ein bisschen Lob muss sein
TopClub - Вечеринки Fryday Afterwork
ПЛАТФОРМА - Fryday Kyiv

Clubs and societies in Ukraine